Victor Manuel Velasco Herrera is a theoretical physicist and researcher at the Institute of Geophysics of the National Autonomous University of Mexico (UNAM). He rejects the scientific consensus on climate change, claiming that the IPCC ignores solar activity, which he considers the most important factor. In the summer of 2008, he predicted the world would "soon" enter a little ice age.

References

External links 
article on Velasco's arguments for a Little ice age being imminent
UNAM page on Velasco (bad link, not dead)

Year of birth missing (living people)
Place of birth missing (living people)
Living people
Academic staff of the National Autonomous University of Mexico
21st-century Mexican physicists